TechRepublic is an online trade publication and social community for IT professionals, providing advice on best practices and tools for the needs of IT decision-makers.

It was founded in 1997 in Louisville, Kentucky, by Tom Cottingham and Kim Spalding, and debuted as a website in May 1999. 

The site was purchased by CNET Networks in 2001 for $23 million. TechRepublic was a part of the Red Ventures business portfolio alongside ZDNet, CNET, GameSpot, and Metacritic.

On August 9, 2021, a Nashville-based technology marketing company, TechnologyAdvice, announced the acquisition of TechRepublic.

References

External links 

Computing websites
Former CBS Interactive websites
Internet properties established in 1997
1997 establishments in Kentucky
2021 mergers and acquisitions